Hymenolaelaps is a genus of mites in the family Laelapidae.

Species
 Hymenolaelaps amphibius (Zakhvatkin, 1948)
 Hymenolaelaps princeps Furman, 1972

References

Laelapidae